Kundedjnjenghmi is a dialect of Bininj Kunwok, an Australian Aboriginal language. The Kundedjnjenghmi dialect is native to the high 'stone country' of the Arnhem Plateau, including the communities of Kabulwarnamyo and Kamarrkawarn. Younger speakers in this area have largely switched to other varieties of Bininj Kunwok, although they retain a passive knowledge of Kundedjnjenghmi. A number of songs by the Nabarlek band use the Kundedjnjenghmi dialect, as do traditional 'Kunborrk' songs.

References

Further reading 
 , 2 volumes

External links
Bininj Kunwok online dictionary

Kunwok

Gunwinyguan languages
Arnhem Land
Indigenous Australian languages in the Northern Territory